The 2005 New Hampshire Wildcats football team represented the University of New Hampshire during the 2005 NCAA Division I-AA football season. It was the program's 111th season and they finished as Atlantic 10 Conference (A-10) co-champions with Richmond after posting a 7–1 record in conference play. The Wildcats earned a berth as the #1 seed into the 16-team Division I-AA playoffs, but were upset in the quarterfinals by Northern Iowa, 21–24. New Hampshire was led by seventh-year head coach Sean McDonnell.

Schedule

Awards and honors
First Team All-America – David Ball (AFCA, Associated Press, Walter Camp); Ricky Santos (Walter Camp); Jonathan Williams (Associated Press, Walter Camp)
First Team All-Atlantic 10 – David Ball, Ricky Santos, Jonathan Williams
Walter Payton Award – Ricky Santos
Atlantic 10 Offensive Player of the Year – Ricky Santos
Eddie Robinson Award – Sean McDonnell

References

New Hampshire
New Hampshire Wildcats football seasons
Atlantic 10 Conference football champion seasons
New Hampshire Wildcats football